Robert Harward is a Navy SEAL.

Robert Harward may also refer to:

Robert Harward (MP) (died 1534)

See also
Robert Harwood (disambiguation)